Our Town is a three-act opera by composer Ned Rorem and librettist J. D. McClatchy.  It is the first opera to be adapted from the Thornton Wilder play of the same name. The opera was commissioned by Indiana University Jacobs School of Music, Opera Boston, the Aspen Music Festival and School, North Carolina School of the Arts, Lake George Opera in Saratoga Springs, N.Y., and Festival Opera in Walnut Creek, Calif.

Roles

The following principal roles appear as listed in the score published by Boosey & Hawkes:
 Stage Manager: Tenor
 Emily Webb, daughter of Mr. and Mrs. Webb: Soprano
 George Gibbs, son of Mr. and Mrs. Gibbs: Tenor
 Dr. Gibbs, the town doctor: Bass
 Mrs. Gibbs: Mezzo-Soprano
 Mr. Webb, the newspaper editor: Baritone
 Mrs. Webb: Mezzo-Soprano
 Mrs. Soames: Mezzo-Soprano
 Simon Stimson, the choirmaster: Tenor
 Joe Crowell, Frank, & Sam, friends of George: Tenor

Performance history

It was premiered by Indiana University Opera Theater with student singers and orchestra on 25 February 2006.  Its professional debut was at the Lake George Opera on 1 July 2006.  It covers the same ground as the play, dealing with birth, maturity and death.  Rorem created pleasant melodies and sparseness to maintain the feel of the original production.  The opera is virtually sung through, with little spoken dialogue.  As with the play, the libretto calls for no sets, a bare stage, and limited props.

The British and European première took place in the Silk Street Theatre at the Guildhall School of Music & Drama on 29 May 2012, directed by Stephen Medcalf and conducted by Clive Timms.

Opening night cast:
(Main roles: Played by)
 Stage Manager: Stuart Laing
 Emily Webb: Sky Ingram
 George Gibbs: Alexandros Tsilogiannis
 Mrs Gibbs: Kathryn McAdam
 Dr. Gibbs: Barnaby Rae
 Mr Webb: Ashley Riches
 Mrs Webb: Emily Blanch
 Simon Stimson: Jorge Navarro-Colorado
 Mrs Soames: Anna Starushkevych

The opera was performed at the Glenn Korff School of Music at the University of Nebraska-Lincoln November 12–15, 2009. The Ohio première took place on 12 February 2010 at the Baldwin-Wallace Conservatory of Music in Berea, Ohio. The Drake University Department of Music presented the Iowa première in Drake's Sheslow Auditorium April 26 & 27, 2013. It was performed at Central City Opera in Colorado during the summer 2013 season and at the Bass School of Music at Oklahoma City University February 21–23, 2014. Boston Opera Collaborative presented the opera in June 2015, and a rare performance was heard at the Eastman School of Music in April 2015 and at Opera Nuova in Edmonton in June 2015. The opera was performed at the Gallo Center for the Arts  in Modesto, California, by the Townsend Opera  January 21 & 22, 2017, and again at the Veterans Memorial Auditorium  in Fresno, California by the Fresno Grand Opera  on January 28 and 29, 2017. These two productions were essentially the same though with local choruses and orchestras. Alison Moritz was Stage Director and Ryan Murray Music Director for both productions. The University of Missouri presented the opera in March 2017 at the Missouri Theater Center for the Arts. Christine Seitz directed the production. From February 7 to February 10, 2019 Southern Methodist University's Meadows School of the Arts will perform the opera in the Bob Hope Theater at the Owen Arts Center.

References

Operas by Ned Rorem
Chamber operas
English-language operas
2006 operas
Operas set in the United States
Operas based on plays
Operas